The 1979–80 FIBA Korać Cup was the ninth edition of FIBA's Korać Cup basketball competition. The Italian Arrigoni Rieti defeated the Yugoslav Cibona in the final on March 26, 1980 in Liège, Belgium. Arrigoni Rieti's victory ended four years of consecutive wins by Yugoslav teams.

First round

|}

Second round

|}

Automatically qualified to round of 16
  Arrigoni Rieti
  Jugoplastika
  Olympiacos
  Standard Liège

Round of 16

Semi finals

|}

Final
March 26, Country Hall du Sart Tilman, Liège

|}

External links
 1979–80 FIBA Korać Cup @ linguasport.com
1979–80 FIBA Korać Cup

1979–80
1979–80 in European basketball